The 1992 United States presidential election in New Jersey took place on November 3, 1992, as part of the 1992 United States presidential election. Voters chose 15 representatives, or electors to the Electoral College, who voted for president and vice president.

New Jersey was won by Governor Bill Clinton (D-Arkansas) with 42.95% of the popular vote over incumbent President George H. W. Bush (R-Texas) with 40.58%, a 2.37% margin of victory. Businessman Ross Perot (I-Texas) finished in third, with 15.61% of the popular vote. Clinton ultimately won the national vote, defeating incumbent President Bush. 

At the time still considered a Republican-leaning swing state, Clinton very narrowly won New Jersey over President Bush. Reflecting this fact, New Jersey weighed in as 2% more Republican than the national average. Clinton's win marked both the first time a Democrat won New Jersey since Lyndon Johnson's landslide win in 1964 as well as the beginning of a long-term shift in New Jersey's politics toward the Democratic Party. New Jersey has voted Democratic in every presidential election since. Indeed, this was the last time New Jersey voted to the right of its swing state neighbor Pennsylvania.

This was the third time New Jersey voted Democratic since the end of World War II. After this election, despite the very slim margin for this year, the Democrat would always win New Jersey by more than 10 points, except in 2004, when John Kerry's margin was just under 7 points. Clinton was the first Democrat to win the White House without Salem County since John F. Kennedy in 1960.

, this is the last election in which Bergen County and Passaic County voted for a Republican presidential candidate. In addition, this was also the last presidential election in New Jersey voted to the right of the country as a whole, along with the most recent when the Republican candidate won more counties in the state.

Results

Results by county

See also
 United States presidential elections in New Jersey
 Presidency of Bill Clinton

References

New Jersey
1992
1992 New Jersey elections